The Haunted Cinema is a 2014 Chinese suspense thriller horror film directed by Yuan Jie. It was released on October 30.

Cast
Liu Yanxi
Luo Xiang
Wei Xingyu
Yu Miao
Tang Chengjing
Zhang Qiyan
Ren Peng
Jiang Yuxi
Dai Chao

Reception
By November 3, the film had earned ¥9.22 million at the Chinese box office.

References

2014 horror thriller films
2014 horror films
Chinese horror thriller films
2014 films